Rev Ramke W. Momin  was born into the Garo tribe of northeastern India, sometime in the 1830s. The Garos did have a reputation for keeping their word. In religious matters, the Garos were animists, focusing on placating the spirits to appease their wrath and satisfy their demands. They believed in a supreme God, but felt that He was detached from men and was not to be much concerned with, either for good or ill. Ramke himself was a devotional person and, while he was an animist, he was very earnest in catching little animals or birds and sacrificing them to the spirits.

In 1847, the British, who were extending their rule in India, invited boys from the Garo tribe to come down to Goalpara in the valley and receive an education. Ramke's uncle, Omed, went down to school at this time, but Ramke was detained at home, since he had recently broken his arm. Later he joined them and was found to be a good scholar. In Goalpara he learned about Hinduism and its teaching about reincarnation. This idea dismayed him. As an animist, he had placated the spirits, but believed that, whether in this life or the next, people were people, not animals or plants.

As he considered ultimate things, he thought not only of wrath and punishment, but of love and about the great God above everything else. He prayed to God for blessing and for peace of mind. After praying thus for three days in a row, he received a visitation from Heaven, declaring that his prayer was heard.

When he tried to tell others about his vision, he received ridicule from everyone except the Hindu “holy men,” or sadhus. They instructed him further in Hindu theology, including Vishnu, a savior figure. Ramke was very attracted to Vishnu, especially in his incarnation as Ram. So, Ramke began to worship Ram.

Later, Ramke came across a Christian tract that systematically discredited Hinduism. He was convinced by the tract, but thrown into despair because his worship of Ram was taken from him. In The Garo Jungle Book, it is said, “The tracts of those days were pointed, uncompromising attacks on the falseness of the prevailing faiths.” Omed, who lived at Gauhati, came across the same tract, but had a more positive reaction. Omed had a Christian associate and invited Ramke to come to Gauhati and together they studied Christianity. Then, as a policeman, Ramke was sent to another assignment, where he fell into discouragement spiritually. But then he read a book about Christian heroism, which helped him.

Among the Garos, the women chose their husbands. A girl named Suban proposed to Ramke and he accepted. After the wedding, he told her he was thinking about becoming a Christian, which she considered a frightening prospect. Nevertheless, after a while Ramke returned to Omed; they studied Christianity more and were baptized, contrary to the wishes of their wives.

They begged for a missionary to be sent to their people, but when none was available, they eventually offered themselves. They were accepted and a salary was given to them. Ramke preached a little, but primarily focused on starting a school in Damra. After preaching for a while, Omed was driven away. He built a hut at the foot of the Rajasimla Pass, where travelers could rest on their way to and from the market. Eventually the witness of these two men and other Christians, including Western missionaries, won over many other Garos to Christianity.

Ramke felt there was a need for another Christian village where new converts could learn more about the faith, without opposition from their neighbors. Thus developed the village of Nisangram.

He was ordained as pastor and served as headmaster of the Normal School, both at Goalpara and at Tura. He assisted in the translation of the Scriptures into Garo and a Bengali-Garo dictionary.

“As preacher and evangelist to his own people he traveled widely and baptized many. ‘On his list were over two thousand two hundred names of those who had found of their Saviour,’ in part, at least, through these personal efforts.” (from “The Garo Jungle Book”, William Carey) He passed to his rest on January 25, 1891.

References

Citations

Sources 

1830s births
1891 deaths
People from Goalpara district
Garo people